Blaen-y-glyn is an area in the community of Llangurig, Powys, Wales, which is 67 miles (108 km) from Cardiff and 160 miles (258 km) from London. Cadw-listed round cairn (SAM number: BR235) also lies nearby.

References

See also 
 List of localities in Wales by population

Villages in Powys